Nina Yeliseyevna Afanasyeva  (pseudonym, ; born February 1, 1939) is a Russian-Sami politician and language activist.

Biography
Nina Yeliseyevna Afanasyeva was born on February 29, 1939, in the village of Varsino. Her parents were Sami, and she grew up with the Kildin Sámi language as her mother tongue.

In 1963, she completed her studies in pedagogy at the Institute of the Peoples of the North in Leningrad and worked until 1983 as a teacher of Russian language and literature as well as German in adult education in the cities of Apatity and Murmansk.

Since 1980, Afanasyeva has been working on the conservation and development of the endangered Sami languages on the Kola Peninsula. She is co-author of the first Kildin Sami-Russian dictionary, which was published in 1985 under the editorship of Rimma Kurutsch. In addition to the dictionary, Afanasyeva co-authored the publication of a series of textbooks and didactic materials for the Kildin language. She is also the author of a Kildin Sami-Russian phrasebook (2010).

Since the time of perestroika, Afanasyeva has been active as a Sami politician and minority activist. She was instrumental in founding the Association of Sámi in Murmansk Oblast in 1998 and headed this NGO from 1990 to 2010, serving as president.

Afanasyeva is fluent not only in Kildin Sami and Russian, but also in Northern Sami and German. She has been working publishing a dictionary for her native dialect, which has hardly been documented by linguists so far. For this purpose, she has been working for several years on the systematization of the familiar vocabulary and collects, with the help of the few surviving speakers, new words, phrases, and place names from the area of their forcibly-displaced birthplace.

On November 23, 2012, Afanasyeva and Alexandra Antonova were awarded the Sami Language Prize Gollegiella ("Golden Language") together during the session of the Norwegian Parliament in Oslo. The award was presented on December 19 at the Norwegian Consulate General in Murmansk. The rationale for the joint award of Afanasyeva and Antonova was their leading role in the revitalization of the Kildin Sámi language as a teacher, politician, writer and translator.

Afanasyeva lives and works in Murmansk.

Selected works
1985 Саамско-русский словарь
1988 Saamʼ kīll: razrabotki po saamskomu jazyku dlja natsjalʼnoj shkoly
1990 Metoditsjeskoje rukovodstvo po obutsjeniju saamskomu jazyku: primernyje pourotsjnyje razrabotki k utsjebniku saamskogo jazyka dlja I-go klassa
1990, Metoditsjeskoje rukovodstvo po obutsjeniju saamskomu jazyku: primernyje pourotsjnyje razrabotki k utsjebniku saamskogo jazyka dlja 2-ogo klassa
1990, Metoditsjeskoje rukovodstvo po obutsjeniju saamskomu jazyku v natsjal’noj shkole
1990, Saamskij jazyk v kartinah: utsjebnik po razvitiju retsji v 1-om klasse saamskoj shkoly
1990, Sam’ kill: utsjebnik saamskogo jazyka dlja 2-go klassa
1991, Pudz’jench: kniga dlja dopolnitel’nogo tsjtenija v saamskoj natsional’noj shkole
1991, Sam’ kill: utsjebnik saamskogo jazyka dlja 3-ogo klassa
1991, Soagknehk’: saamsko-russkij i russko-saamskij slovar’ dlja natsjal’noj shkoly
1995, Pravila orfografii i punktuacii saamskogo jazyka
2000, "Hilferuf vom Rande des Eismeers", in: Die Saami, hrsg. von Wolf-Dieter Seiwert. Leipzig
2008, Ла̄зер ка̄ллса моаййнас. Кырьха лӣ Е̄льцэ Нӣна
2009, Severnoe sijanie: saamskij jazyk v kartinkah
2010, Самь-рушш соарнънэгк
2012, "Современное состояние саамского языка", in: Коренные народы евро-арктического региона

Awards
 2012, International Sami Language Award Gollegiella (together with Aleksandra Andreevna Antonova)

References

Bibliography
 Øverland, Indre & Berg-Nordlie, Mikkel. Bridging the Divides: Ethno-Political Leadership among the Russian Sámi. Oxford: Berghahn Books, 2012.
 Wolf-Dieter Seiwert (ed.) Die Saami. Indigenes Volk am Anfang Europas.. Leipzig: German-Russian Center, 2000. (in German)

1939 births
Living people
People from Lovozersky District
Russian educational theorists
Soviet educators
Russian Sámi politicians
Women linguists
Language activists
Linguists of Kildin Sámi
20th-century Russian writers
20th-century Russian women writers
21st-century Russian writers
21st-century Russian women writers
Soviet educational theorists